Nadezda Alekseevna  Makroguzova (born 2 April 1997) is a Russian beach volleyball player. As of 2016, she plays with Svetlana Kholomina. They qualified for the 2020 Summer Olympics in Tokyo.

Professional career
Nadezda and her partner Svetlana Kholomina are the two-time silver medalists in the U21 World championship (2016, 2017). In 2019 they won the 4-star tournament of the FIVB Beach Volleyball World Tour in Portugal. In 2021 the partners took the silver medals in FIVB Beach Volleyball World Tour's  4-star tournament in Cancún, Mexico.

References

External links
 
 
 
 

1997 births
Living people
Russian beach volleyball players
Sportspeople from Krasnodar
Beach volleyball players at the 2020 Summer Olympics